This is a list of women writers who were born in Iceland or whose writings are closely associated with that country.

A
Anna Mjöll Ólafsdóttir, jazz songwriter
Anna Svanhildur Björnsdóttir, poet
Arndís Þórarinsdóttir, children's books author
Auður Ava Ólafsdóttir (born 1958), novelist, poet
Auður Jónsdóttir (born 1973), novelist, playwright, journalist
Auður Laxness, writer and wife of Halldór Laxness

Á 
Álfrún Gunnlaugsdóttir (born 1938), novelist
Áslaug Jónsdóttir, children's book author
Ágústína Jónsdóttir (born 1949), poet

B
Bergljót Arnalds, children's book author
Bergþóra Árnadóttir, folk song writer
Birgitta Jónsdóttir (born 1967), politician, poet, editor
Björk, songwriter
Bryndís Björgvinsdóttir (born 1982), novelist
Brynhildur Þórarinsdóttir (born 1970), children's writer

D
Drífa Viðar (1920–1971), writer, artist and educator

E
Elín Briem (1856–1937), teacher, cookbook writer
Elín Ebba Gunnarsdóttir (born 1953), short story writer
Elísabet Jökulsdóttir (born 1958), poet, short story writer, playwright, journalist
Elsa G. Vilmundardóttir (1932–2008), Iceland's first female geologist
Erla Stefánsdóttir (1935–2015), writes on elf habitats in Iceland

F
Fríða Á. Sigurðardóttir (1940–2010), novelist, short story writer

G
Gerður Kristný (born 1970), poet, short story writer, novelist, children's writer
Guðný Halldórsdóttir (born 1954), film director, screenwriter
Guðrún Eva Mínervudóttir (born 1976), acclaimed novelist
Guðrún frá Lundi (1887–1975), novelist
Guðrún Helgadóttir (born 1935), children's writer, playwright
Guðrún Kristín Magnúsdóttir (born 1939), author
Guðrún Lárusdóttir (1880–1938), writer

H
Hallfríður Ólafsdóttir (1964–2020), children's author
Hallgerður Gísladóttir (1952 – 2007), ethnologist, writings on Icelandic food, poet
Hallgerður Gísladóttir (1952 – 2007), poet
Helgi Pjeturss (1872 – 1949), scientific writer
Hera Hjartardóttir (born 1983), songwriter
Hulda, pen name of Unnur Benediktsdóttir Bjarklind, poet, short story writer, novelist

I
 Íeda Jónasdóttir Herman (c. 1918–2019), author and adventurer
 Ingibjörg Haraldsdóttir (1942–2016), poet, translator

J
 Jónína Leósdóttir (born 1954), novelist, playwright, journalist
 Jórunn skáldmær 10th century skald
 Jófríður Ákadóttir (born 1994) songwriter
 Jakobína Sigurðardóttir

K
Kristín Eiríksdóttir (born 1981), poet and writer
Kristín Helga Gunnarsdóttir (born 1963), children's writer, journalist
Kristín Marja Baldursdóttir (born 1949), novelist, playwright
Kristín Ómarsdóttir (born 1962), poet, playwright, novelist
Kristín Steinsdóttir (born 1946), children's writer, playwright

L
Lilja Sigurdardottir (born 1972), crime-fiction novelist, playwright, screenwriter
Linda Vilhjálmsdóttir (born 1958), poet, playwright

M
 María Lilja Þrastardóttir (born 1986) author

N
 Nína Björk Árnadóttir (1941–2000), playwright, poet, novelist
 Nanna Bryndís Hilmarsdóttir songwriter

O
Oddný Eir (born 1972), autobiographical novelist, publisher

Ó
Ólína Þorvarðardóttir (born 1958), politician, journalist, non-fiction writer

R
Ragna Sigurðardóttir (born 1962), short story writer, poet, translator
Ragnheiður Gestsdóttir (born 1953), children's writer, novelist
Rósa Guðmundsdóttir (1795–1855), poet, writer of ballads and folk tales

S
Steinunn Finnsdóttir (c.1640 – c.1710), poet
Steinunn Refsdóttir (10th century), pre-Christian poet 
Steinunn Sigurðardóttir (born 1950), poet, novelist, journalist
Svava Jakobsdóttir (1930–2004), feminist politician, leading novelist, short story writer, poet, playwright
Sigrún Davíðsdóttir (born 1955), Journalist		
Sigrún Edda Björnsdóttir (born 1958), author		
Sigurbjörg Þrastardóttir (born 1973), poet		
Sigurlaug Gísladóttir (born 1984), songwriter		
Sóley Stefánsdóttir (born 1986), songwriter			
Steinvör Sighvatsdóttir (1210–1271), poet		
Svala Björgvinsdóttir (born 1977), songwriter

T
Þórdís Gísladóttir (born 1965), children's writer, poet, translator
Þórunn Elfa Magnúsdóttir (1910–1995), novelist
Þórhildur Sunna Ævarsdóttir (born 1987), journalist
Torfhildur Þorsteinsdóttir (1845–1918), first Icelandic woman novelist, short story writer, writer of folk tales

V
Valgerður Þóroddsdóttir (born 1989), author
Vigdís Grímsdóttir (born 1953), poet, short story writer, novelist, children's writer
Vilborg Dagbjartsdóttir (1930–2021), modernist poet, feminist, children's writer, translator
Vilborg Davíðsdóttir (born 1965), novelist, journalist

Y
Yrsa Sigurðardóttir (born 1963), internationally successful crime-fiction novelist, children's writer
Yvonne K. Fulbright, Icelandic-American sexologist, writings on sex and sex education since 2003

See also
List of Icelandic writers
List of women writers

References

External links
Icelandic women writers from The History of Nordic Women's Literature

-
Icelandic women writers, List of
Writers, List of Icelandic
Women writers, List of Icelandic